The 2009 Oceania Handball Champions Cup featured nine teams from five countries competing for the fourth edition of the Men Oceania Champions Cup held in New Zealand.

The final saw Sydney Region from Australia winning an Oceania Champions Cup  over Tahitian side AS Faa'a. The third place play off saw a replay of last years final with AS Dumbea winning over fellow New Caledonia side JS Mont Dore. Wellington from New Zealand were fifth and the second Australian side Melbourne sixth. AS Taravao from Tahiti seventh, Northland from New Zealand eighth and AS Lulu from Wallis and Futuna rounded out the field in ninth.

Final standings

References

 Campeões Estaduais de Handebol (Spanish)
 Articles on Les Nouvelles Caledoniennes (French)

Oceania Handball Champions Cup
2009 in handball